The Rahway murder of 1887 is the murder of an unidentified young woman whose body was found in Rahway, New Jersey on March 25, 1887. She is also known as the Unknown Woman or the Rahway Jane Doe.

Four brothers traveling to work at the felt mills by Bloodgood's Pond in Clark, New Jersey early one morning found the young woman lying off Central Avenue near Jefferson Avenue several hundred feet from the Central Avenue Bridge over the Rahway River. Her body lay at the side of the road in a pool of blood that had frozen in the cold. Her throat had been cut twice from ear to ear, her hands were wounded, and the entire right side of her face was extensively bruised from a severe beating.

The footprints surrounding her body were said to be "huge."

Description
The woman appeared to be in her early 20s, and was described as attractive, with brown hair and blue eyes. She was found clad in a dark green cashmere dress that had been trimmed with green feathers and a fur cape to protect from the cold. She also wore yellow kid gloves, what were described by the papers as "foreign good shoes," a black hat made of straw with red-colored velvet trimmings adorning it, a black dotted veil, and a bonnet. She had carried a basket of eggs. Other belongings were found in the Rahway River.

Aftermath

Her murder was the subject of national headlines and hundreds came to view the body. Investigators had her embalmed body photographed dressed in the clothes she was found in and these images were circulated widely, but neither she nor her killer were ever identified. Rahway police still have the original photographs taken of her body, which were among the first to be taken as evidence by a police department.

One researcher stated that a post mortem picture of her appears in the March 30, 1887 New York World.

She was buried in May 1887 next to the Merchants' and Drovers' Tavern in Rahway Cemetery.

Her ghost is said to haunt Rahway Cemetery.

At the time of the woman's murder, Francis Tumblety, one of the many controversial purported suspects in the Jack the Ripper slayings (according to Ripperologists) was living in New York City. New York City is twenty miles from the site and one could travel from there to Rahway in roughly 35 minutes; therefore at least one historian has speculated as to the theoretical possibility that Tumblety is connected to the murder.

See also
List of unsolved murders

References

Further reading
 Indianapolis Journal 4 April 1887 ("Suspicion that the Rahway Corpse Is the Remains of Lillian Snavely. Watson Claims that He Was in Baltimore at the Time the Murder")
 The Brooklyn Daily Eagle (Brooklyn, New York), Sunday, April 10, 1887, Page 4.
 Peter Genovese. New Jersey Curiosities: Quirky Characters, Roadside Oddities & Other Offbeat Stuff (2003).
 Mark Sceurman, Mark Moran. Weird N.J.: Your Travel Guide to New Jersey's Local Legends and Best Kept Secrets (2003).
 Sleuth, Old. Young dyer: Or," Piping" the Stratford murder mystery. A companion to the Rahway mystery. Munro, 1887. (A dime novel or penny dreadful)
 The Rahway murder mystery: Little Lynx "piping" the roadside tragedy. New York. Munro, 1887. (a dime novel or penny dreadful)
 The New York Times (March 1887) ("NO LIGHT ON THE MYSTERY; ONE POSSIBLE CLUE TO RAHWAY'S MURDER. THE MYSTERIOUS STRANGER PROBABLY A CRANK").
 June 16, 1887 - THE RAHWAY MURDER MYSTERY. Chicago Tribune.
 "Nothing But Idle Rumors - The Rahway Murder Still A Mystery" New York Times (April 6, 1887)

External links

1860s births
1887 murders in the United States
1887 deaths
1887 in New Jersey
Deaths by stabbing in the United States
Female murder victims
Incidents of violence against women
People from Rahway, New Jersey
People murdered in New Jersey
Unidentified murder victims in New Jersey
History of women in New Jersey